Konstantin Gluhov (born January 17, 1980) is a Latvian heavyweight kickboxer and mixed martial artist of Russian descent. He is a former WPKA World Muaythai champion, currently competing in K-1. He made his K-1 debut in 2006 at K-1 Fighting Network Riga 2006 against Denis Sobolyev.

Biography and career
Konstantin Gluhov started karate and hand-to-hand fighting in 1996 at the Fair Fighting club with coaches Saulius Sheikis and Vasily Fleisher. But just a couple of months later, the club shifted to kickboxing. In the same year, 1996, Kostya wins his first title with his teammate Alexei Kharchuk - Latvian kickboxing champion (youth). In the amateur ring, Glukhov won the world championships in Thai boxing, Kickboxing and Kick-jitsu. In 2000, after 60 amateur fights, Konstantin became a professional.

In 2006 and 2008, Gluhov as part of the Latvian national team won the world championship in universal combat (unifight). And in 2009, he became Europe Champion (unifight).

In 2007, in Sochi, Gluhov lost for WBKF world championship belt to Alexei Kudin from Belarus

On November 22, 2008 Gluhov won the K-1 World Grand Prix 2008 in Riga tournament by three consecutive knockouts over Marco Della Ricca, Pacome Assi and Mindaugas Sakalauskas.

March 26, 2009 in Moscow hosted a kickboxing world championship tournament, which was attended by Pavel Zhuravlev, Alexei Kudin, Konstantin Gluhov and Elvin Abbasov. Gluhov lost in the finals to Zhuravlev

Gluhov's debut in MMA took place in 2006 in Finland. Konstantin won his first fight by TKO in the first round over Atte Backman, Finland.

At the KSW XII 8-men tournament Konstantin won the quarterfinal of the Pole Daniel Omielanczuk, but in the tournament finals, already at KSW XIII, he lost to the American David Olivia.

In December 2010, Gluhov took part in the Ultimate Cage Fighters Championship 16-men tournament, held in Vienna. Having won 4 early victories, including over Serb Miodrag Petkovic, whom Gluhov lost in previous competitions, Konstantin won the UCFC belt.

Championships and accomplishments

Kickboxing
 2010 K-1 World Grand Prix Selection champion
 2009 WBKF World Tournament (+93 kg) runner up
 2008 Warrior's Honor Tournament Champion
 2008 K-1 World Grand Prix 2008 in Riga champion
 2006 Masters Fight Night tournament finalist
 2006 WBKF Europe Tournament (+93 kg) runner up
 2005 WBKF Europe Tournament (+93 kg) runner up
 2005 2nd Draka European championships (+90 kg) champion
 2004 1st Draka European championships (+90 kg) champion
 2002 WPKA World Heavyweight champion
 2002 WPKA Heavyweight Champion of Asia
 2002 WPKA Baltic States Heavyweight Champion
 2000 IKF European champion

Boxing
 2012 Bigger's Better 12 elimination tournament winner, Lithuania, 2012

Mixed martial arts
HIT Fighting Championship
HIT FC Heavyweight Champion
International League MMA
Oleg Taktarov Cup Tournament Winner
Konfrontacja Sztuk Walki
KSW Heavyweight Tournament second place
M-1 Global
2013 M-1 Global Heavyweight Grand Prix second place
Pancrase Fighting Championship
PFC Heavyweight Championship (2 Times, current)
PFC 3 Tournament Winner
Russian MMA Championship
Russian MMA Championship Tournament second place
Ultimate Cage Fighting Championship
2010 UCFC 20,000 Euro Tournament Winner
2009 UCFC 20,000 Dollar Tournament Runner Up
Warrior's Honor
Warrior's Honor Superfight Winner
Warrior's Honor 3 Tournament Winner
Kick-Jitsu
2005 World Champion kick-jitsu (+91 kg)
UNIFIGHT
2009 "Universal Fight" Europe Championships (+95 kg) champion
2009 Xth  "Universal Fight" World Championships (+95 kg) vice-champion
2008 IXth  "Universal Fight" World Championships (+95 kg) champion
2006 VIIth "Universal Fight" World Championships (+95 kg) champion
WFCA
2008 WFCA European Heavyweight (+96 kg) MMA champion

Kickboxing record
 
|-  bgcolor="#FFBBBB"
| 2021-09-22 || Loss ||align=left| Ștefan Lătescu || Dynamite Fighting Show 12 || Baia Mare, Romania || Decision (Unanimous) || 3 || 3:00
|-  bgcolor="#FFBBBB"
| 2021-06-04 || Loss ||align=left| Ionuț Iancu || |Dynamite Fighting Show 11 || Bucharest, Romania || Ext R. Decision (Unanimous) || 4 || 3:00
|-  bgcolor="#CCFFCC"
| 2020-03-01 || Win ||align=left| Khundech|| Muai Thai fight|| Phuket, Thailand || КО || 2 || 0:57
|-  bgcolor="#FFBBBB"
| 2018-09-06 || Loss ||align=left| Eldar Oliveira Garcia || TNA || Kazan, Russia || Decision (Unanimous) || 4 || 3:00
|-  bgcolor="#CCFFCC"
| 2018-06-27 || Win ||align=left| Maxim Bolotov || TNA || Kazan, Russia || КО || 4 || 0:58
|-  bgcolor="#FFBBBB"
| 2018-05-12 || Loss ||align=left| Ye Xiang || Sanda Prime Ligue || Shanghai, China || Decision (Unanimous) || 3 || 3:00
|-  bgcolor="#CCFFCC"
| 2018-04-01 || Win ||align=left| Davit || Muai Thai fight || Phuket, Thailand || КО || 3 || 0:22
|-  bgcolor="#FFBBBB"
| 2017-12-07 || Loss||align=left| Cotne Rogava || Kung Fu Kings || Hebei, China || КО || 1 || 0:33
|- style="background:#fbb;"
| 2015-12-26 || Loss ||align=left|  Roman Kryklia || Akhmat Fight Show || Grozny, Russia || Decision (Unanimous) || 3 || 3:00  
|-
|-  bgcolor="#FFBBBB"
| 2015-11-21 || Loss ||align=left| Murat Aygun || Kunlun Fight 34 || Shenzhen, China || Decision || 3 || 3:00
|-
|-  bgcolor="#FFBBBB"
| 2015-03-17 || Loss ||align=left| Hesdy Gerges || Kunlun Fight 21 - Super Heavyweight Tournament, Quarter Finals  || Sanya, China || TKO (Low kicks) || 3 || 0:35
|-
|-  bgcolor="#CCFFCC"
| 2015-02-01 || Win ||align=left| Mighty Mo || Kunlun Fight 18: The Return of the King - Super Heavyweight Tournament, Final 16 || Guangzhou, China || TKO (elbow injury) || 1 || 2:00
|-
|-  bgcolor="#FFBBBB"
| 2010-12-29 || Loss ||align=left| Zamig Athakishiyev || RMO 2010 Istanbul Finals || Istanbul, Turkey || DQ || 4 || 
|-
! style=background:white colspan=9 |
|-
|-  bgcolor="#CCFFCC"
| 2010-12-29 || Win ||align=left| Murat Kadirov || RMO 2010 Istanbul Semi Finals || Istanbul, Turkey || KO (Spinning back kick) || 1 || 
|-  bgcolor="#CCFFCC"
| 2010-12-29 || Win ||align=left| Kadir Yıldırım || RMO 2010 Istanbul Quarter Finals || Istanbul, Turkey || TKO (Retirement) || 1 || 
|-  bgcolor="#CCFFCC"
| 2010-11-13 || Win ||align=left| Awadh Tamim || WFCA – Fight Arena: Latvia vs. Russia  || Riga, Latvia || KO (Punches)|| 1 || 1:05
|-  bgcolor="#CCFFCC"
| 2010-04-24 || Win ||align=left| Vitaly Shemetov || K-1 World Grand Prix Selection 2010 Final || Istanbul, Turkey || KO (Low kicks) || 2 || 1:07
|-
! style=background:white colspan=9 |
|-
|-  bgcolor="#CCFFCC"
| 2010-04-24 || Win ||align=left| Zamig Athakishiyev || K-1 World Grand Prix Selection 2010 Semi Finals || Istanbul, Turkey || Decision (Unanimous)   || 3 || 3:00
|-  bgcolor="#CCFFCC"
| 2010-04-24 || Win ||align=left| Brian Douwes || K-1 World Grand Prix Selection 2010 Quarter Finals || Istanbul, Turkey || Decision (Unanimous) || 3 || 3:00
|-  bgcolor="#FFBBBB"
| 2010-03-28 || Loss ||align=left| Paul Slowinski || K-1 World Grand Prix 2010 in Warsaw || Warsaw, Poland || KO (Right Overhand Punch) || 2 || 
|-  bgcolor="#CCFFCC"
| 2009-10-22 || Win||align=left| Stanislav Belokonj || Warrior's Honor || Kharkov, Ukraine || Decision (Unanimous) || 3 || 3:00
|-  bgcolor="#CCFFCC"
| 2009-10-22 || Win||align=left| Ibragim Magomedov || Warrior's Honor, 4-men tournament, final|| Kharkov, Ukraine || КО || 1 || 1:17
|-  bgcolor="#CCFFCC"
| 2009-10-22 || Win||align=left| Yurii Dubko || Warrior's Honor, 4-men tournament, 1/2 final || Kharkov, Ukraine || Unanimous decision || 3 || 2:00
|-  bgcolor="#FFBBBB"
| 2009-03-26 || Loss ||align=left| Pavel Zhuravlev || WBKF World Tournament, Final (+93 kg) @ Club Arbat || Moscow, Russia || Decision (Unanimous) || 3 || 3:00
|-
! style=background:white colspan=9 |
|-
|-  bgcolor="#CCFFCC"
| 2009-03-26 || Win ||align=left| Elvin Abbasov || WBKF World Tournament, Semi Finals (+93 kg) @ Club Arbat || Moscow, Russia || Decision (Unanimous) || 3 || 3:00
|-  bgcolor="#FFBBBB"
| 2009-02-27 || Loss ||align=left| Zabit Samedov || K-1 Professional International Tournament || Baku, Azerbaijan || Decision (Unanimous) || 3 || 3:00
|-  bgcolor="#CCFFCC"
| 2008-12-17 || Win ||align=left| Pavel Zhuravlev || Final tournament of the project “Warrior's Honor” || Kharkov, Ukraine || Decision (Unanimous) || 3 || 3:00
|-
! style=background:white colspan=9 |
|-
|-  bgcolor="#CCFFCC"
| 2008-12-17 || Win||align=left| Alexey Gonchar || Final tournament of the project “Warrior's Honor” || Kharkov, Ukraine || KO || 1 || 0:38
|-  bgcolor="#CCFFCC"
| 2008-12-17 || Win||align=left| Artur Hamidulin || Final tournament of the project “Warrior's Honor” || Kharkov, Ukraine || TKO (corner stop) || 1 || 0:33
|-  bgcolor="#CCFFCC"
| 2008-11-22 || Win ||align=left| Mindaugas Sakalauskas || K-1 World Grand Prix 2008 in Riga Final || Riga, Latvia || TKO (low kicks) || 2 || 0:41
|-
! style=background:white colspan=9 |
|-
|-  bgcolor="#CCFFCC"
| 2008-11-22 || Win ||align=left| Pacome Assi || K-1 World Grand Prix 2008 in Riga Semi Finals || Riga, Latvia || KO (Spinning back kick) || 2 || 1:47
|-  bgcolor="#CCFFCC"
| 2008-11-22 || Win ||align=left| Marco Della Ricca || K-1 World Grand Prix 2008 in Riga Quarter Finals || Riga, Latvia || KO || 1 || 0:26
|-  bgcolor="#FFBBBB"
| 2008-10-18 || Loss ||align=left| Ashwin Balrak || Latvijā – "Milžu cīņas" || Liepāja, Latvia || Decision (Majority) || 3 || 3:00
|-  bgcolor="#FFBBBB"
| 2008-08-18 || Loss ||align=left| Attila Karacs || K-1 Rules Tournament 2008 in Hungary || Debrecen, Hungary || Ext. R Decision || 4 || 3:00
|-  bgcolor="#CCFFCC"
| 2008-05-23 || Win  ||align=left| Dmitry Borulko|| Qualifying tournament of the project “Warrior's Honor” || Kharkov, Ukraine|| TKO || 3 || 1:44
|-  bgcolor="#CCFFCC"
| 2008-05-23 || Win ||align=left| Sergey Kravchina|| Qualifying tournament of the project “Warrior's Honor” || Kharkov, Ukraine || KO || 2 || 1:22
|-  bgcolor="#CCFFCC"
| 2008-05-23 || Win ||align=left| Muhamadshin|| Qualifying tournament of the project “Warrior's Honor” || Kharkov, Ukraine || KO || 1 || 0:36
|-  bgcolor="#FFBBBB"
| 2008-04-04 || Loss ||align=left| Pavel Zhuravlev || Qualifying tournament of the project “Warrior's Honor” || Kharkov, Ukraine || Decision (Split) || 3 || 3:00
|-  bgcolor="#CCFFCC"
| 2008-04-04 || Win ||align=left| Badalian || Qualifying tournament of the project “Warrior's Honor” || Kharkov, Ukraine || KO || 2 || 0:20
|-  bgcolor="#CCFFCC"
| 2008-04-04 || Win ||align=left| Andrii Embalaev || Qualifying tournament of the project “Warrior's Honor” || Kharkov, Ukraine || KO || 1 || 1:30
|-  bgcolor="#FFBBBB"
| 2007-10-21 || Loss||align=left| Shamil Abdurahimov || Yalta Open World Championship kickjitsu 1/2 final|| Yalta, Ukraine || Unanimous decision 3:0 || 3 || 2:00
|-  bgcolor="#FFBBBB"
| 2007-10-20 || Loss ||align=left| Dmitry Bezus || Kickboxing World Cup || Yalta, Ukraine || Decision || 3 || 3:00
|-  bgcolor="#c5d2ea"
| 2007-10-13 || Draw ||align=left| Gary Goodridge || K-1 Fighting Network Latvia 2007 || Riga, Latvia || Decision draw || 3 || 3:00
|-  bgcolor="#CCFFCC"
| 2007-07-13 || Win ||align=left| Yuksel Ayaydin || A1 Kickbox || Turkey || 3 || 3:00 || 
|-
|-  bgcolor="#CCFFCC"
| 2007-07-06 || Win ||align=left| Stephane Gomis || A-1 Cyprus || Nikosia, Cyprus || TKO (Corner stoppage) || 3 || 2:59
|-  bgcolor="#FFBBBB"
| 2007-06-06 || Loss||align=left| Alexei Kudin || WBKF World championship (+96 kg) @ Club Arbat || Sochi, Russia || Unanimous decision 3:0 || 10 || 2:00
|-
! colspan="8" style="background:white" |
|-  bgcolor="#FFBBBB"
| 2007-04-28 || Loss ||align=left| Florian Ogunade || MFN Fight Night || Duisburg, Germany || Ext. R Decision (Split)|| 6 || 3:00
|-  bgcolor="#FFBBBB"
| 2006-11-04 || Loss ||align=left| Maksim Neledva || K-1 Fighting Network Riga 2006 Semi Finals || Riga, Latvia || Ext. R Decision (Majority) || 4 || 3:00
|-  bgcolor="#CCFFCC"
| 2006-11-04 || Win ||align=left| Denis Sobolyev || K-1 Fighting Network Riga 2006 Quarter Finals || Riga, Latvia || KO || 1 || 1:07
|-  bgcolor="#CCFFCC"
| 2006-10-04 || Win||align=left| Alexander Kitichenko || Yalta Open World Championship kickjitsu Final|| Yalta, Ukraine || KO || 1 || 1:21
|-  bgcolor="#CCFFCC"
| 2006-10-03 || Win||align=left| kickboxing fighter || Yalta Open World Championship kickjitsu 1/2 final|| Yalta, Ukraine || KO || 1 || 0:30
|-  bgcolor="#FFBBBB"
| 2006-05-06 || Loss ||align=left| Karl Glyschinski || Masters Fight Night Heavyweight tournament, final || Düsseldorf, Germany || Decision (Split) || 3 || 3:00
|-
! style=background:white colspan=9 |
|-
|-  bgcolor="#CCFFCC"
| 2006-05-06 || Win ||align=left| Florian Ogunade || Masters Fight Night Heavyweight tournament, semi final || Düsseldorf, Germany || Ext R. Decision (Unanimous) || 4 || 3:00
|-  bgcolor="#CCFFCC"
| 2006-05-06 || Win ||align=left| Mounier Zekhnini || Masters Fight Night Heavyweight tournament, quarter final || Düsseldorf, Germany || Decision (Unanimous) || 3 || 3:00
|-  bgcolor="#FFBBBB"
| 2006-03-29 || Loss ||align=left| Eduard Voznovich || WBKF European championship (+96 kg) @ Club Arbat || Moscow, Russia || Decision (Unanimous) || 8 || 2:00
|-
! style=background:white colspan=9 |
|-  bgcolor="#CCFFCC"
| 2005-09-30 || Win||align=left| fighter from Poltava city || Muai Thai Championship Yalta Open|| Yalta, Ukraine || ЕDecision (Unanimous) || 3 || 2:00
|-
|-  bgcolor="#CCFFCC"
| 2005-05-28 || Win ||align=left| Yevgeny Orlov || 2nd Draka European Championships Finals|| Riga, Latvia || Decision (145:143) || 5 || 2:00
|-
! style=background:white colspan=9 |
|-
|-  bgcolor="#CCFFCC"
| 2005-05-28 || Win ||align=left| Andrey Kindrich || 2nd Draka European championships 1/2 finals || Riga, Latvia || Decision (147:140) || 5 || 2:00
|-  bgcolor="#CCFFCC"
| 2005-04-29 || Win||align=left| Tihomir Brunner || Draka European championships, superfight|| Riga, Latvia || Decision (Unanimous) || 5 || 2:00
|-  bgcolor="#CCFFCC"
| 2005-03-14 || Win ||align=left| Alexander Novovic || 2nd Draka European championships 1st Stage|| Riga, Latvia || KO || 4 || 
|-  bgcolor="#FFBBBB"
| 2005-01-12 || Loss ||align=left| Eduard Voznovich || WBKF European championship (+96 kg) Final @ Club Arbat || Moscow, Russia || Decision (Unanimous) || 8 || 2:00
|-
! style=background:white colspan=9 |
|-  bgcolor="#CCFFCC"
| 2004-09-01 || Win||align=left| Andrey Kindrich || Club Cristal|| Moscow, Russia ||decision (Unanimous) || 5 || 2:00 ||
|-  bgcolor="#CCFFCC"
| 2004-07-28 || Win ||align=left| Yaroslav Zavorotny || WBKF European championship (+93 kg) 1/4 Final @ Club Arbat || Moscow, Russia || Decision (Unanimous) || 5 || 3:00
|-  bgcolor="#CCFFCC"
| 2004-05-09 || Win ||align=left| Mourad Bouzidi || 1st Draka European Championships Finals|| Riga, Latvia || Decision || 5 || 2:00
|-
! style=background:white colspan=9 |
|-
|-  bgcolor="#CCFFCC"
| 2004-05-09 || Win ||align=left| Petri Reima || 1st Draka European Championships 1/2 finals|| Riga, Latvia || Decision || 5 || 2:00
|-  bgcolor="#CCFFCC"
| 2004-05-09 || Win ||align=left| Jessie Gibbs || 1st Draka European Championships 1/4 finals|| Riga, Latvia || KO (Left high kick) || 1 || 
|-  bgcolor="#CCFFCC"
| 2004-04-21 || Win ||align=left| Eduard Voznovich || WBKF (+93 kg) @ Club Arbat || Moscow, Russia || KO || 3 || 
|-  bgcolor="#CCFFCC"
| 2004-03-31 || Win ||align=left| Mikhail Shvoev || WBKF (+93 kg) @ Club Arbat || Moscow, Russia || TKO || 4 || 
|-  bgcolor="#CCFFCC"
| 2004-02-25 || Win ||align=left| Andrei Zuravkov || WBKF (+93 kg) @ Club Arbat || Moscow, Russia || Decision (Split) || 5 || 3:00
|-  bgcolor="#CCFFCC"
| 2004-01-28 || Win ||align=left| David Shvelidze || WBKF (+93 kg) @ Club Arbat || Moscow, Russia || TKO || 4 || 
|-  bgcolor="#FFBBBB"
| 2003-08-30 || Loss ||align=left| Ruslan Abbasov || WAKO World Championship, low-kick ||Yalta, Ukraine|| Decision (Split)|| 3||2:00
|-  bgcolor="#CCFFCC"
| 2003-08-29 || Win ||align=left| Ruslan Bisaev || WAKO World Championship, low-kick ||Yalta, Ukraine|| КО || 2||1:16
|-  bgcolor="#CCFFCC"
| 2003-08-28 || Win ||align=left| Dragan Jovovich || WAKO World Championship, low-kick ||Yalta, Ukraine|| TKO || 1||1:24
|-  bgcolor="#CCFFCC"
| 2003-08-15 || Win ||align=left| Taras Vorotnik || Bogdan Khmelnitsky Cup ||Cherkasy, Ukraine|| КО || 3||1:15
|-  bgcolor="#CCFFCC"
| 2003-03-23 || Win  ||align=left| Marius Skirius || Ringa  Karali 7 ||Riga, Latvia || TKO || 6||2:00
|-
! colspan="8" style="background:white" |
|-
|-  bgcolor="#CCFFCC"
| 2002-10-08 || Win ||align=left| Aslan Khazamatov || III Open Asian Kickboxing championship || Astana, Kazakhstan || Ext. R Decision || 4 || 3:00
|-
! style=background:white colspan=9 |
|-
|-  bgcolor="#CCFFCC"
| 2002-02-21 || Win ||align=left| Toms Ievins || Ringa  Karali 5 ||Riga, Latvia || Decision (Unanimous) || 7||2:00
|-
! colspan="8" style="background:white" |
|-
|-  bgcolor="#CCFFCC"
| 2001-05-19|| Win ||align=left| Stanislav Evteev || Ringa  Karali 4 ||Riga, Latvia || ТКО || 3||1:36
|-  bgcolor="#CCFFCC"
| 2000-10-14 || Win ||align=left| Roman Krasnikov || Kinga Karali 2 || Riga, Latvia || Decision || 10 || 2:00 
|-
! style=background:white colspan=9 |
|-
|-  bgcolor="#CCFFCC"
| 2000-04-13 || Win||align=left| Roman Krasnikov || Ringa  Karali 1 || Riga, Latvia || Decision (Unanimous) || 3||2:00
|-
| colspan=9 | |- Legend:

Mixed martial arts record

|-
| Win
| align=center| 34–17
| Oleg Kubanov
| TKO
| Samara MMA Federation: Battle on the Volga 7
| 
| align=center| 1
| align=center| 2:17
| Kazan, Russia
|
|-
| Win
| align=center| 33–17
| Dritan Barjamaj
| TKO
| Hit Fighting Championship 6
| 
| align=center| 1
| align=center| 4:41
| Zürich, Switzerland
| <small>Won the HIT FC Heavyweight Championship belt
|-
| Win
| align=center| 32–17
| Rodney Wallace
| KO (spinning back kick to the body)
| ProFC 63
| 
| align=center| 2
| align=center| 2:58
| Rostov-on-Don, Russia
| 
|-
| Loss
| align=center| 31-17
| Kleber Silva
| Decision (unanimous)
| M-1 Challenge 81 - Battle in the Mountains 6 
| 
| align=center| 3
| align=center| 5:00
| Nazran, Russia
| align=center|
|-
| Win
| align=center| 31–16
| Istvan Ruzsinszki
| TKO (arm injury)
| FFC - Faith Fighting Championship
| 
| align=center| 1
| align=center| 4:21
| Shenzhen, China
| 
|-
| Win
| align=center| 30–16
| Sandro Vieira da Silva
| TKO (punches)
| SH - Super Hero 1
| 
| align=center| 1
| align=center| 2:45
| Nanchang, China
| 
|-
| Win
| align=center| 29–16
| Tony Lopez
| Decision (unanimous)
| Kunlun Fight 44
| 
| align=center| 2
| align=center| 5:00
| Khabarovsk, Russia
| 
|-
| Loss
| align=center| 28–16
| Ante Delija
| Decision (unanimous)
| M-1 Challenge 56
| 
| align=center| 3
| align=center| 3:00
| Moscow, Russia
| <small>
|-
| Loss
| align=center| 28–15
| Damian Grabowski
| Submission (arm-triangle choke)
| M-1 Challenge 53 - Battle in the Celestial Empire
| 
| align=center| 3
| align=center| 1:47
| Beijing, China
| <small>
|-
| Win
| align=center| 28–14
| Valentijn Overeem
| KO (punch)
| PFC 6 – Pancrase Fighting Championship 6
| 
| align=center| 1
| align=center| 2:33
| Marseille, France
| <small>Defended PFC Heavyweight Championship
|-
| Win
| align=center| 27–14
| Kenny Garner
| Decision (unanimous)
| M-1 Challenge 46
| 
| align=center| 3
| align=center| 5:00
| St. Petersburg, Russia
|
|-
| Loss
| align=center| 26–14
| Mikhail Gazaev
| DQ (illegal kick)
| M-1 Challenge 44
| 
| align=center| 3
| align=center| 1:03
| Tula, Russia
| <small>Kicked the head of grounded opponent.
|-
| Loss
| align=center| 26–13
| Marcin Tybura
| Submission (rear-naked choke)
| M-1 Challenge 42: Final grand prix 2013
| 
| align=center| 1
| align=center| 4:30
| St. Petersburg, Russia
| <small>M-1 Grand Prix: Final
|-
| Win
| align=center| 26–12
| Valentijn Overeem
| KO (knee)
| PFC 5 – Pancrase Fighting Championship 5
| 
| align=center| 1
| align=center| 
| Marseille, France
| <small>Defended PFC Heavyweight Championship
|-
| Win
| align=center| 25–12
| Kenny Garner
| Decision (split)
| M-1 Challenge 38: Spring Battle
| 
| align=center| 3
| align=center| 5:00
| St. Petersburg, Russia
| <small>M-1 Grand Prix: Quarter Finals
|-
| Loss
| align=center| 24–12
| Peter Graham
| TKO (punches)
| Draka 11
| 
| align=center| 1
| align=center| 3:20
| Moscow, Russia
|
|-
| Loss
| align=center| 24–11
| Alexander Emelianenko
| Decision (unanimous)
| M-1 Challenge 34
| 
| align=center| 3
| align=center| 5:00
| Moscow, Russia
|
|-
| Loss
| align=center| 24–10
| Alexei Kudin
| Decision (unanimous)
| RMMAC – Russian MMA Championship
| 
| align=center| 2
| align=center| 5:00
| Saint Petersburg, Russia
| <small>Russian MMA Championship tournament final.
|-
| Win
| align=center| 24–9
| Andrei Sen
| KO (head kick)
| RMMAC – Russian MMA Championship
| 
| align=center| 1
| align=center| 
| Saint Petersburg, Russia
| <small>Russian MMA Championship tournament semi-final.
|-
| Win
| align=center| 23–9
| Timur Shikhmagomedo
| TKO (punches)
| RMMAC – Russian MMA Championship
| 
| align=center| 1
| align=center| 
| Saint Petersburg, Russia
| <small>Russian MMA Championship tournament quarter-final.
|-
| Win
| align=center| 22–9
| Alexander Sitalo
| KO (punch)
| Fight Star – Taktarov's Cup
| 
| align=center| 2
| align=center| 2:39
| Novgorod, Russia
|
|-
| Win
| align=center| 21–9
| Viktor Matviychuk
| TKO (punch)
| Oplot Challenge
| 
| align=center| 1
| align=center| 0:52
| Kharkiv, Ukraine
|
|-
| Loss
| align=center| 20–9
| Peter Graham
| KO (punch) 	
| Governor's Cup 2012
| 
| align=center| 2
| align=center| 2:47
| Khabarovsk, Russia
|
|-
| Loss
| align=center| 20–8
| Alexei Kudin
| Decision (unanimous) 	
| WUFC: Challenge of Champions
| 
| align=center| 2
| align=center| 5:00
| Makhachkala, Russia
|
|-
| Loss
| align=center| 20–7
| Jermaine van Rooy
| TKO (knee injury)
| Klondaika Fight Arena
| 
| align=center| 1
| align=center| 
| Riga, Latvia
| align=center| 
|-
| Win
| align=center| 20–6
| Valdas Pocevicius
| TKO (body punch)
| Fight Stars
| 
| align=center| 1
| align=center| 1:33
| Anapa, Russia
|
|-
| Win
| align=center| 19–6
| Ruslan Magomedov
| TKO (body punch)
| Warrior's Honor 3
| 
| align=center| 1
| align=center| 1:19
| Kharkov, Ukraine
| Warrior's Honor 3 Finals
|-
| Win
| align=center| 18–6
| Yuri Gorbenko
| Submission (toe hold)
| Warrior's Honor 3
| 
| align=center| 1
| align=center| 2:35
| Kharkov, Ukraine
| Warrior's Honor 3 Semifinals
|-
| Win
| align=center| 17–6
| Jessie Gibbs
| TKO (body punch)
| Pancrase Fighting Championship 3
| 
| align=center| 1
| align=center| 3:24
| Marseille, France
| Won the PFC Heavyweight Championship
|-
| Win
| align=center| 16–6
| Arnold Oborotov
| Submission (toe hold)
| Pancrase Fighting Championship 3
| 
| align=center| 1
| align=center| 0:38
| Marseille, France
| PFC Heavyweight Championship Tournament Semifinals
|-
| Win
| align=center| 15–6
| Michał Kita
| TKO
| Fighters Arena Lódz 2
| 
| align=center| 2
| align=center| 5:00
| Lódz, Poland
|
|-
| Loss
| align=center| 14–6
| Baga Agaev
| Submission (armbar)
| UAMA: Honor of Warrior
| 
| align=center| 1
| align=center| 1:30
| Kharkov, Ukraine
|
|-
| Win
| align=center| 14–5
| Radoslav Radev
| KO (punches)
| UCFC – 20.000 Euro Tournament, Finals
| 
| align=center| 1
| align=center| 1:05
| Vienna, Austria
| 
|-
| Win
| align=center| 13–5
| Miodrag Petkovic
| KO (punches)
| UCFC – 20.000 Euro Tournament, Semi Finals
| 
| align=center| 2
| align=center| 3:42
| Vienna, Austria
| 
|-
| Win
| align=center| 12–5
| Grigor Aschugbabjan
| TKO (punches)
| UCFC – 20.000 Euro Tournament, Quarter Finals
| 
| align=center| 1
| align=center| 2:17
| Vienna, Austria
| 
|-
| Win
| align=center| 11–5
| Chris Male
| KO (punches)
| UCFC – 20.000 Euro Tournament
| 
| align=center| 1
| align=center| 1:00
| Vienna, Austria
| 
|-
| Win
| align=center| 10–5
| Salimgirey Rasulov
| KO (punches)
| International League MMA – Oleg Traktarov Cup
| 
| align=center| 2
| align=center| 1:52
| Saransk, Russia
| Oleg Taktarov Cup Finals
|-
| Win
| align=center| 9–5
| Vagam Bodjukyan
| KO (punches)
| International League MMA – Oleg Taktarov Cup
| 
| align=center| 1
| align=center| 4:05
| Saransk, Russia
| Oleg Taktarov Cup Semifinals
|-
| Win
| align=center| 8–5
| Alexander Romaschenko
| TKO (punches)
| Warrior's Honor 2
| 
| align=center| 1
| align=center| 1:35
| Kharkiv, Ukraine
| Warrior's Honor 2 Finals
|-
| Win
| align=center| 7–5
| Vitalii Yalovenko
| TKO (punches)
| Warrior's Honor 2
| 
| align=center| 3
| align=center| 0:23
| Kharkiv, Ukraine
| Warrior's Honor 2 Semifinals
|-
| Loss
| align=center| 6–5
| David Oliva
| Decision (unanimous)
| KSW 13: Kumite
| 
| align=center| 3
| align=center| 5:00
| Katowice, Poland
| KSW Heavyweight Tournament Finals
|-
| Win
| align=center| 6–4
| Daniel Omielańczuk
| Decision (majority)
| KSW 12: Pudzianowski vs. Najman
| 
| align=center| 2
| align=center| 5:00
| Warsaw, Poland
| KSW Heavyweight Tournament Semifinals
|-
| Loss
| align=center| 5–4
| Miodrag Petkovic
| TKO (knee injury)
| UCFC – 20.000 Dollar Tournament
| 
| align=center| 1
| align=center| 0:29
| Vienna, Austria
| 
|-
| Win
| align=center| 5–3
| Grigor Aschugbabjan
| TKO (corner stoppage)
| UCFC – 20.000 Dollar Tournament
| 
| align=center| 3
| align=center| 68:07
| Vienna, Austria
| 
|-
| Win
| align=center| 4–3
| Slavomir Molnar
| TKO (corner stoppage)
| UCFC – 20.000 Dollar Tournament
| 
| align=center| 2
| align=center| 5:00
| Vienna, Austria
| 
|-
| Loss
| align=center| 3–3
| Ibragim Magomedov
| TKO (punches)
| IAFC: Russia vs The World
| 
| align=center| 1
| align=center| 1:37
| Novosibirsk, Russia
|
|-
| Win
| align=center| 3–2
| Tadas Rimkevicius
| Decision (unanimous)
| WFCA Fight Club Riga 2
| 
| align=center| 4
| align=center| 3:00
| Riga, Latvia
|
|-
| Win
| align=center| 2–2
| Peter Mulder
| Submission
| WFCA: Latvia vs the Netherlands
| 
| align=center| 1
|
| Riga, Latvia
| Won WFCA European Heavyweight Championship
|-
| Loss
| align=center| 1–2
| Dan Evensen
| Decision (unanimous)
| BodogFIGHT: USA vs Russia
| 
| align=center| 3
| align=center| 5:00
| Moscow, Russia
|
|-
| Loss
| align=center| 1–1
| Todd Gouwenberg
| Decision (unanimous)
| BodogFIGHT: Vancouver
| 
| align=center| 3
| align=center| 5:00
| Vancouver, British Columbia, Canada
|
|-
| Win
| align=center| 1–0
| Atte Backman
| TKO (injury)
| Fight Festival 19
| 
| align=center| 1
| align=center| 0:50
| Helsinki, Finland
|

UNIFIGHT record

|-
|-  bgcolor="#FFBBBB"
| 2009-10-26 || Поражение ||align=left| Shamil Magomedov|| ЧМ UNIFIGHT, №10 || Prague, Czech republic || Unanimous decision || 5 || 2:00
|-  bgcolor="#CCFFCC"
| 2009-10-26 || Победа ||align=left| Orgikbek Palvanov|| ЧМ UNIFIGHT, №10 || Prague, Czech republic || ТКО || 1 || 1:14
|-  bgcolor="#CCFFCC"
| 2009-10-26 || Победа ||align=left| Oleg Hait|| ЧМ UNIFIGHT, №10 || Prague, Czech republic  || КО || 1 || 0:35
|-  bgcolor="#CCFFCC"
| 2009-09-20 || Победа ||align=left| Nikolaj Titov|| ЧЕ UNIFIGHT || Qusar, Azerbaijan || КО || 1 || 0:27
|-  bgcolor="#CCFFCC"
| 2009-09-19 || Победа ||align=left| Bahruz Farhadov|| ЧЕ UNIFIGHT || Qusar, Azerbaijan || opponent retired|| 0 || 0:00
|-  bgcolor="#CCFFCC"
| 2008-10-26 || Победа ||align=left| Goncharov|| ЧМ UNIFIGHT, №9 || Kaliningrad, Russia || КО || 1 || 0:22
|-  bgcolor="#CCFFCC"
| 2008-10-25 || Победа ||align=left| hand-to-hand combater|| ЧМ UNIFIGHT, №9 || Kaliningrad, Russia || КО || 1 || 0:39
|-  bgcolor="#CCFFCC"
| 2008-10-24 || Победа ||align=left| hand-to-hand combater|| ЧМ UNIFIGHT, №9 || Kaliningrad, Russia || opponent retired || 0 || 0:00
|-  bgcolor="#CCFFCC"
| 2006-09-03 || Победа ||align=left| Dmitrij Zabolotnij|| ЧМ UNIFIGHT, №7 || Kaliningrad, Russia || opponent retired || 0 || 0:00
|-  bgcolor="#CCFFCC"
|| 2006-09-02 || Победа ||align=left| Babij|| ЧМ UNIFIGHT, №7 || Kaliningrad, Russia || KO (low-kick) || 2 || 1:18
|-  bgcolor="#CCFFCC"
| 2006-09-01 || Победа ||align=left| hand-to-hand combater|| ЧМ UNIFIGHT, №7 || Kaliningrad, Russia || ТKO (submission) || 2 || 0:44
|-

BIGGER'S BETTER BOXING record

|-
|-  bgcolor="#FFBBBB"
| 2012-12-14 || Loss||align=left| Sergei Masloboev|| BIGGER'S BETTER KING|| Riga, Latvia || Unanimous decision || 5 || 3:00
|-  bgcolor="#CCFFCC"
| 2012-05-25 || Win ||align=left| Kamil Sokolowski|| BIGGER'S BETTER 12 || Vilnius, Lithuania || Unanimous decision || 3 || 3:00
|-  bgcolor="#CCFFCC"
| 2012-05-25 || Win ||align=left| Adrian Poputea|| BIGGER'S BETTER 12 || Vilnius, Lithuania || ТКО || 3 || 2:18
|-  bgcolor="#CCFFCC"
| 2012-05-25 || Win||align=left| Sergei Masloboev|| BIGGER'S BETTER 12 || Vilnius, Lithuania || Unanimous decision || 3 || 3:00
|-

See also
 List of K-1 events
 List of K-1 champions
 List of male kickboxers

References

External links

1980 births
Living people
Latvian male kickboxers
Heavyweight kickboxers
Latvian male mixed martial artists
Heavyweight mixed martial artists
Mixed martial artists utilizing karate
Latvian male karateka
Latvian people of Russian descent
People from Jūrmala
Kunlun Fight kickboxers
Kunlun Fight MMA Fighters